The Boundiali Solar Power Station, is a proposed  solar power plant in Ivory Coast, the largest economy in the Francophone West Africa zone.

Location

Overview
The power station has a capacity of 37.5 megawatts, sold directly to the state-owned Ivorian electricity utility company, Société de Gestion du Patrimoine du Secteur de l'Electricité (SOGEPE), for integration in the national electricity grid. The electricity is evacuated via a substation near the power station. The energy generated will power approximately 30,000 homes. In addition to supplying the country with 37.5 megawatts of clean energy, the power station will enable Ivory Coast avoid the emission of 27,000 tonnes of carbon dioxide annually. Up to 300 construction jobs were created during the construction phase.

Developers
The power station was developed by the government of Ivory Coast, with financial backing from the European Union and the German Investment and Development Bank (KfW).

Construction
The engineering, procurement and construction (EPC) contract was awarded to Eiffage Énergie Systèmes, a subsidiary of the French Eiffage Group. To mitigate the lack of sunshine at night, the developers of this solar farm decided to install a 10MW/13.8MWh lithium battery energy storage system (BESS). Eiffage Énergie Systèmes has selected Saft, a subsidiary of TotalEnergies, to design and install the BESS, in six containers on site.

Construction costs and funding
The cost of construction was budgeted at €40 million. The table below illustrates the sources of funding for this power plant.

See also

List of power stations in Ivory Coast

References

External links
 Ivory Coast aims to generate 150 MW of solar power by 2020 As of 29 November 2018.
 Ivory Coast to build two solar power plants As of 21 November 2019.

Solar power stations in Ivory Coast
Savanes District
Buildings and structures in Ivory Coast